Scottish Asian (Asian-Scottish or Asian-Scots) is a term defined within the 2011 Scottish census as including people of Bangladeshi, Chinese, Indian, Pakistani or other Asian ancestry resident in Scotland. Their parents or grandparents are normally Asian immigrants. It can also refer to people who are of dual Scottish and Asian ancestry. It combines Asian ethnic background with Scottish national identity.

In traditional British usage, the term Asian did not normally include East Asians, who were referred by their respective national origins (e.g. Chinese, Japanese, Malaysians and others) or collectively as "Oriental", which similar to Scotch can be viewed of as pejorative when applied to people. By contrast, in traditional North American usage the term Asian did not normally include South Asians but focused on East and Southeast Asians, particularly Chinese, Japanese and Vietnamese. These frames of reference reflect different migration patterns.

Census 
The 2001 and 2011 censuses recorded the following ethnic groups:

In addition to ethnicity, the 2011 census asked about national identity.

 34 per cent of all minority ethnic groups felt they had some Scottish identity either on its own or in combination with another identity. This ranged from 60 per cent for people from a mixed background and 50 per cent for those from a Pakistani ethnic group, to 21 per cent for those from an African ethnic group. This compared to 83 per cent for all people in Scotland.
 62 per cent of the total population stated ‘Scottish identity only’ as their national identity, of which 98 per cent stated their ethnicity as ‘White: Scottish’. 
 18 per cent of the total population stated ‘Scottish and British identity only’ as their national identity, of which 97 per cent stated their ethnicity as ‘White: Scottish’.
 8 per cent of the total population stated their national identity as ‘British identity only’. Of these,  49 per cent stated their ethnicity as ‘White: Scottish’, 38 per cent were ‘White: Other British’, and 8 per cent were ‘Asian’.
 4 per cent of the total population stated their national identity as  ‘Other identity only’ (i.e. no UK identity), 32 per cent of those were ‘White: Other White’, 22 per cent were ‘Asian’ and 21 per cent were ‘White: Polish’.

South Asian communities

Scotland's South Asian population of more than 80,000 is mostly from Indian and Pakistani background. The majority are adherents of the Hindu, Sikh and Islamic faiths and are concentrated around urban areas, such as Greater Glasgow, Edinburgh and Dundee. However, there are Asian communities in places as small as Stornoway and as far north as Aberdeen.

Dundee - 4,000 Asians (especially the Hilltown and Stobswell)
Edinburgh -  26,264 Asians
Glasgow (and surrounding Greater Glasgow area) - 65,000 Asians (especially Pollokshields, Pollokshaws, Govanhill, Newton Mearns, Bearsden, East Kilbride and Woodlands)

Notable Scottish Asians

Arts and entertainment
 Ali Abbasi, media presenter and writer
 Danny Bhoy, comedian
 Shabana Bakhsh, actress
 Serena Dalrymple
 Hassan Ghani, journalist and broadcaster
 Catriona Gray
 Mahtab Hussain, photographer
 Sara Ishaq, film maker
 Katie Leung, actress
 MC-VA, rapper
 Aasmah Mir, television and radio presenter
 Shereen Nanjiani, television and radio presenter
 Kiran Sonia Sawar, actress
 Marli Siu, actress
 KT Tunstall, musician
 Atta Yaqub, actor and model

Business
 Poonam Gupta, businesswoman
 Angela Malik, chef and entrepreneur
 Tony Singh, chef and entrepreneur

Politics
 Bashir Ahmad - first MSP to be elected from an Asian background. Member of the SNP
 Mushtaq Ahmad - Lord Provost of South Lanarkshire 
 Foysol Choudhury - Labour MSP for Lothian region. First MSP of Bangladeshi descent
 Pam Gosal - Conservative MSP for West Scotland region. First female MSP of Indian descent
 Ayesha Hazarika - Labour political advisor
 Bashir Maan - former Labour councillor
 Hanzala Malik - former Labour MSP for the Glasgow region; the first Scottish Asian MSP from the Scottish Labour Party
 Nosheena Mobarik - (Conservative member of the House of Lords; former MEP for Scotland)
 Claude Moraes - former Labour MEP for London
 Anum Qaisar-Javed - SNP MP for Airdrie and Shotts
 Jainti Dass Saggar - first non-white local authority councillor in Scotland
 Anas Sarwar - Leader of the Scottish Labour party, first ethnic minority to be leader of a Scottish political party. MSP for Glasgow region (2016–present); former Labour MP for Glasgow Central (2010-2015)
 Mohammed Sarwar - former Labour MP for Glasgow Central (1997-2010), father of Anas Sarwar
 Kaukab Stewart, SNP MSP for Glasgow Kelvin. First MSP female of colour elected
 Humza Yousaf - SNP MSP for Glasgow Pollok, Cabinet Secretary for Justice

Sport
 Aqeel Ahmed, boxer
 Tanveer Ahmed, boxer
 Jamie Bhatti, rugby union player 
 Asim Butt, cricketer
 David Changleng, rugby union player and referee
 Malcolm Changleng, rugby union player and referee
 Ukashir Farooq, boxer
 Majid Haq, cricketer
 Omer Hussain, cricketer
 Moneeb Iqbal, cricketer
 Jazz Juttla, former footballer
 Vishal Marwaha, hockey player
 Rashid Sarwar, former footballer
 Qasim Sheikh, cricketer
 Mo Yaqub, footballer

Other
 Roza Salih, activist
 Mohammed Atif Siddique, convicted of terrorism offences
 Mamta Singhal, winner of the Women Engineering Society Prize - Young Women Engineer of the Year 2007; finalist for Global MBA student of the Year 2008

Popular culture
 Ae Fond Kiss... (film on New Scots)
 Bombay Talkie
 Nina's Heavenly Delights

See also
 Demographics of Scotland
 Buddhism in Scotland
 Hinduism in Scotland
 Islam in Scotland
 Sikhism in Scotland
 Scottish people
 British Asian
 New Scots

References

Scottish people of South Asian descent
Ethnic groups in Scotland
Immigration to Scotland
Asian diaspora in the United Kingdom